DLB most often refers to Dementia with Lewy bodies, one of the two Lewy body dementias.

DLB may also refer to: 

Deep Listening Band, an American musical group
Dictionary of Literary Biography, a specialist encyclopedia dedicated to literature published by Gale
Dolby Laboratories, a company specializing in audio noise reduction and audio encoding/compression